is a railway station in the city of Ōbu, Aichi Prefecture, Japan, operated by Central Japan Railway Company (JR Tōkai).

Lines
Ōbu Station is served by the Tōkaidō Main Line, and is located 346.5 kilometers from the starting point of the line at Tokyo Station.

Station layout
The station has a single side platform and two island platforms, serving five tracks, although Platform 5 is not in normal use. The platforms are connected by footbridges. The station building has automated ticket machines, TOICA automated turnstiles and a staffed ticket office.

Platforms

Adjacent stations

|-
!colspan=5|Central Japan Railway Company

Station history
Ōbu Station was opened on 10 September 1887 when the section of the Japanese government railway connecting Hamamatsu Station with Ōbu Station was completed. The station building was rebuilt in 1978. With the privatization and dissolution of the JNR on 1 April 1987, the station came under the control of the Central Japan Railway Company.

Station numbering was introduced to the section of the Tōkaidō Line operated JR Central as well as the Taketoyo Line in March 2018; Ōbu Station was assigned station number CA60 for the Tōkaidō Line and CA00 for the Taketoyo Line.

Passenger statistics
In fiscal 2018, the station was used by an average of 14,753 passengers daily.

Surrounding area
 Ōbu City Hall
 Ōbu Elementary School
University of Human Environments, Ōbu campus

See also
 List of Railway Stations in Japan

References

Yoshikawa, Fumio. Tokaido-sen 130-nen no ayumi. Grand-Prix Publishing (2002) .

External links

official home page

Railway stations in Japan opened in 1887
Railway stations in Aichi Prefecture
Tōkaidō Main Line
Taketoyo Line
Stations of Central Japan Railway Company
Ōbu, Aichi